Chipping Barnet is a constituency created in 1974 represented in the House of Commons of the UK Parliament since 2005 by Theresa Villiers of the Conservative Party. Villiers was the Secretary of State for Northern Ireland from 2012 until 2016 under the leadership of Prime Minister David Cameron before she was dismissed when the incoming Prime Minister Theresa May took office. Boris Johnson appointed her as Secretary of State for Environment, Food and Rural Affairs in July 2019 before she was sacked in February 2020. It is part of the London Borough of Barnet.

Constituency profile
Barnet was once an elevated narrow projection of Hertfordshire into the county of Middlesex, and consisted of an agricultural market town.  The town became well connected to central London by the London Underground network and is today commuter suburbia, with many of its properties semi-detached with substantial gardens as well as having many small parks and nature reserves.  The area has few tower blocks for social housing.

Electoral Calculus categorises the seat with a "Kind Yuppies" demographic, indicating well-educated younger voters who could vote for either the Conservatives or Labour but opposed Brexit.

Boundaries

1974–1997: The London Borough of Barnet wards of Arkley, Brunswick Park, East Barnet, Hadley, and Totteridge.

1997–2010: As above plus Friern Barnet.

2010–present: The London Borough of Barnet wards of Brunswick Park, Coppetts, East Barnet, High Barnet, Oakleigh, Totteridge, and Underhill.

For the 2010 general election, following a review of parliamentary representation and as a consequence of changes to ward boundaries, the Boundary Commission for England recommended that parts of Underhill ward and Coppetts ward be transferred to Chipping Barnet from the constituencies of Hendon and Finchley and Golders Green respectively. It also recommended that a small part of Mill Hill ward be transferred from Chipping Barnet to Hendon.

Members of Parliament

Elections 
It has been held by a Conservative since its creation for the February 1974 general election, and withstood the Labour landslide in 1997 by just over 2% (1,035 votes).  The 2015 result gave the seat the 92nd most marginal majority of the Conservative Party's 331 seats by percentage of majority. In 2017, the Conservatives came closer than ever before to losing Chipping Barnet, with incumbent Theresa Villiers retaining the seat by just 353 votes, with Labour then holding the majority of councillors in the constituency, in Brunswick Park, Coppetts, East Barnet, and Underhill. However, as a result of the 2018 Barnet London Borough Council elections, the Conservatives held a majority of councillors in Brunswick Park, High Barnet, Oakleigh, and Totteridge. 

As of the 2021 by-election in East Barnet  ward, the Conservatives held a majority of councillors in this ward until the 2022 local elections. 

In the 2022, the Conservatives local representation on Barnet Council in the constituency became confined to the new Totteridge and Woodside ward, along with High Barnet and Barnet Vale which split their seats between Conservatives and Labour, with Labour winning Whetstone (rough successor to Oakleigh) for the first time, recovering ground in Brunswick Park by winning all three seats and regaining the seats they had lost in East Barnet in 2018 and 2021. 

In the 2019 general election, the seat was seen as an important potential gain for the Labour Party, due to Villiers' small majority and high-profile (as the Environment Secretary) and the seat's vote to remain in the 2016 European Union membership referendum. Nevertheless, Villiers retained the seat with a majority increased threefold, albeit still a small one.

Elections in the 2010s

Elections in the 2000s

Elections in the 1990s

Elections in the 1980s

Elections in the 1970s

See also 
 List of parliamentary constituencies in London

Notes

References

External links 
nomis Constituency Profile for Chipping Barnet — presenting data from the ONS annual population survey and other official statistics.
Politics Resources (Election results from 1922 onwards)
Electoral Calculus (Election results from 1955 onwards)

Politics of the London Borough of Barnet
Parliamentary constituencies in London
Constituencies of the Parliament of the United Kingdom established in 1974